Taivo Mägi (born on 19 October 1960 in Tartu) is an Estonian track and field athlete and coach.

In 1986 he graduated from Tartu State University in physical education.

1980–1986 he become 6-times Estonian champion in different running disciplines. 1980–1986 he was a member of Estonian national team.

Since 1987 he is working as a coach.

Students: Grit Šadeiko, Maris Mägi, Rasmus Mägi.

Awards:
 2014: Estonian Coach of the Year

Personal life 
He is married to track and field athlete and coach Anne Mägi. Their son is hurdler Rasmus Mägi and their daughter is sprinter Maris Mägi.

References 

Living people
1960 births
Estonian male sprinters
Estonian athletics coaches
University of Tartu alumni
Sportspeople from Tartu